The Women's 10m air rifle event at the 2010 South American Games was held on March 23, with the qualification at 12:00 and the Finals at 14:00.

Individual

Medalists

Results

Qualification

Final

Team

Medalists

Results

References
Qualification
Final
Team

10m Air Rifle W